Katie Quinn Lowes (born September 22, 1982) is an American actress and theater director. She is best known for her role as Quinn Perkins in the ABC political drama series Scandal (2012–2018) and her portrayal of Rachel DeLoache Williams in the Netflix drama series Inventing Anna (2022).

Early life 
Lowes was born in Queens, New York City and grew up in Port Washington, New York, where she graduated in 2001 from Paul D. Schreiber Senior High School. Her father is Irish Catholic, and her mother is Jewish.

She graduated from New York University's Tisch School of the Arts with BFA in acting.

Career
She was cast in the stage play Four Saints in Mexico. In 2004, Lowes landed her first screen role in the FX series Rescue Me and later co-starred opposite Marcia Gay Harden in the Showtime pilot, Hate. Lowes later guest starred in the number of television series, including The Sopranos, Without a Trace, NCIS, Ghost Whisperer, Castle, Leverage, and The Closer. In 2008, she starred opposite Laurie Metcalf in The CW short-lived comedy-drama series, Easy Money. In addition to her television performances, Lowes appeared in a number of low-budget films, including  The Job (2009), Bear (2010), and Café (2011).

Lowes is best known for her role as Quinn Perkins, formerly Lindsay Dwyer, in the ABC political drama series Scandal created by Shonda Rhimes. Before Scandal, Lowes had guest roles on Shonda Rhimes' Grey's Anatomy and Private Practice. Before landing her breakout role on the show, she worked as nanny for Connie Britton's adopted son.

With her husband, Adam Shapiro, she is one of the founders and directors of the Los Angeles-based IAMA Theater Company, and a supporter of Southern California's black box theater community.

In July 2018, Lowes made her Broadway debut, along with her husband Shapiro, in the Broadway production of Waitress. They remained in the production until October 7, 2018.

On May 14, 2021, CBS announced that Lowes will star opposite Pete Holmes in a sitcom based around the life of laid-off auto worker-turned-professional bowler Tom Smallwood. The multi-camera series has a mid-season debut planned for the 2021–22 television season. On November 24, CBS announced the sitcom has been retitled How We Roll, and received an adjusted first season order of 11 episodes. On December 10, 2021, CBS announced the series will premiere on March 31, 2022. In May 2022, the series was canceled after one season.

Lowes played Rachel DeLoache Williams in Shonda Rimes' Inventing Anna, a Netflix miniseries released in February 2022.

Personal life
Lowes lives in Los Angeles with her husband, actor Adam Shapiro. Shapiro played her character's boyfriend in an episode of Scandal. In May 2017, she announced that she and her husband were expecting their first child, a boy. She announced the birth of their son, Albee Shapiro, on October 5, 2017. Lowes gave birth to their daughter, Vera Shapiro, on November 22, 2020.

Filmography

Film

Television

References

External links
 
 
 

1982 births
Living people
21st-century American actresses
Actresses from New York City
American film actresses
American people of Irish descent
American television actresses
American voice actresses
Jewish American actresses
Paul D. Schreiber Senior High School alumni
People from Port Washington, New York
People from Queens, New York
Tisch School of the Arts alumni